The Quỳnh Văn culture is the name given to a period of the Neolithic Age in Vietnam, after the name of the site in :vi:Quỳnh Văn.

References

Ancient Vietnam
Archaeological cultures of Southeast Asia
Archaeological cultures in Vietnam
Neolithic cultures of Asia